Sarbuk Rural District is a rural district (dehestan) in Sarbuk District, Qasr-e Qand County, Sistan and Baluchestan province, Iran. At the 2006 census, its population was 17,728, in 3,384 families.  The rural district has 35 villages.

References 

Rural Districts of Sistan and Baluchestan Province
Qasr-e Qand County